Day Trip is a studio album by jazz guitarist Pat Metheny with bassist Christian McBride and drummer Antonio Sanchez. It was released by Nonesuch Records on January 29, 2008.

Background
The album has also been released in versions that include one bonus track ("Whatnot") and in a reissue package combined with Tokyo Day Trip.

Track listing

Personnel
 Pat Metheny – acoustic and electric guitar, guitar synthesizer
 Christian McBride – double bass
 Antonio Sánchez – drums

Charts
Album - Billboard

References 

Pat Metheny albums
2008 albums
Nonesuch Records albums
Instrumental albums